Metophyma is cushion-like swellings on the forehead above the saddle of the nose.

See also
 List of cutaneous conditions
 Phymas in rosacea

References

Acneiform eruptions